ʿUqba ibn Nāfiʿ ibn ʿAbd al-Qays al-Fihrī al-Qurashī, also simply known as Uqba ibn Nafi, was an Arab general serving the Rashidun Caliphate since the reign of Umar and later the Umayyad Caliphate during the reigns of Muawiyah I and Yazid I, leading the Muslim conquest of the Maghreb, including present-day Algeria, Tunisia, Libya and Morocco.

Uqba was the nephew of Amr ibn al-As. He is often surnamed al-Fihri in reference to the Banu Fihri, a clan connected to the Quraysh. His descendants would be known as the ʿUqbids or Fihrids. Uqba is the founder of the cultural city of Kairouan in Tunisia.

Uqba accompanied Amr in his initial capture of cities in North Africa starting with Barca, then proceeding to Tripolitania in 644. In 670 now the emir or commander, Uqba led an Arab army to North Africa, crossing the Egyptian deserts, and setting up military posts at regular intervals along his route. In a region of what is now Tunisia, he established the town now called Kairouan (meaning "camp" or "caravanserai" in Persian) about 99 miles south of present-day Tunis, which he used as a base for further operations.

According to one legend, one of Uqba's soldiers stumbled across a golden goblet buried in the sands. It was recognized as one that had disappeared from Mecca some years before, and when it was dug out of the sand a spring appeared, with waters said to come from the same source as those of the sacred Zamzam Well in Mecca. This story led to Kairouan becoming a place of pilgrimage and then a holy city ("the Mecca of the Maghreb") and the most important city in North Africa.

In 683 Uqba was ambushed by the Berber Christian king Kusaila and his Byzantine allies in the Battle of Vescera. Uqba was killed beside his hated rival, Abu al-Muhajir Dinar. His armies evacuated Kairouan and withdrew to Barca, though it was recaptured in 688. Al-Watiya Air Base in Libya is also known as "Okba ibn Nafa Air Base" after him.

Historical accounts

Extant records of most of the accounts describing Arab conquests of North Africa in general and Uqba's conquests in particular date back to at least two centuries after the conquests took place.

One of the earliest reports comes from the Andalucian chronicler Ibn Idhari in his Al-Bayan al-Mughrib. In it, Ibn Idhari describes the moment when Uqba reached the Atlantic Ocean, where he allegedly said: | 

Edward Gibbon, referring to Uqba ibn Nafi as Akbah, gives him the title "Conqueror of Africa," beginning his story when he "marched from Damascus at the head of ten thousand of the bravest Arabs; and the genuine force of the Moslems was enlarged by the doubtful aid and conversion of many thousand Barbarians." He then marched into North Africa. Gibbon continues: "It would be difficult, nor is it necessary, to trace the accurate line of the progress of Akbah." On the North African coast, "the well-known titles of Bugia, and Tangier define the more certain limits of the Saracen victories." Gibbon then tells the story of Akbah's conquest of the Roman province of Mauretania Tingitana:
Although much scholarship on the life and conquests of ibn Nafi are available, most have not been translated from their original Arabic into English or French.

See also 

 Wheelus Air Base
 Medieval Muslim Algeria
 Berbers and Islam
 Kusaila
 Early Muslim conquests
 Asid bin Kurz al-Bajali

References and notes

External links
Edward Gibbon, History of the Decline and Fall of the Roman Empire Chapter 51

Further reading

622 births
683 deaths
Generals of the Umayyad Caliphate
Arab generals
Umayyad governors of Ifriqiya
Medieval Arabs killed in battle
7th-century rulers in Africa
7th-century Arabs
Muslim conquest of the Maghreb
Fihrids
City founders